Montclair is an unincorporated community in Davidson County, North Carolina.  It lies at an elevation of 745 feet.

References

Unincorporated communities in Davidson County, North Carolina
Unincorporated communities in North Carolina